Dance of the Drunk Mantis is a 1979 Hong Kong kung fu film directed by Yuen Siu-tien's real-life son Yuen Woo-ping, and produced by Ng See-yuen, who also writer with Lung Hsiao. It stars Yuen Siu-tien, Hwang Jang-lee, Linda Lin, Yuen Shun-yi, Charlie Shek and Yuen Kwai. This was Yuen Siu-tien's final film appearance before his death on 8 January 1979 from a heart attack. The film was released on 27 June 1979.

Plot
One year after training a young Freddy Wong (Jackie Chan) in Drunken Master, Beggar So / Sam Seed returns to find that his wife has adopted a son named Foggy. Sam takes a disliking to the boy and tortures him mentally and physically. Devastated, the boy runs away and takes a job at an inn, where he meets Rubber Legs and his student. He overhears that they are looking for Beggar So and want to kill him, making Rubber Legs' Northern 'Drunk Mantis' Boxing supreme.

However, Foggy returns home to warn Beggar So, who has been injured by Rubber Legs. Beggar So sends Foggy to a sickness teacher for herbs to cure him, and the doctor teaches him a dreaded style called 'Sickness Boxing'. Now, armed with this sick form of fighting, Foggy is ready for Drunk Mantis. In the end, Foggy goes berserk and kills Rubber Legs. Unable to escape from his trance, he sees Rubber Legs when he looks at Beggar So and attacks him. The film closes with a freeze frame as Foggy leaps after his adopted father as the doctor watches on.

Cast
Yuen Siu-tien – Beggar So / Sam Seed
Hwang Jang-lee – Rubber Legs
Linda Lin Ying – Beggar So's wife
Yuen Shun-yi – Foggy
Charlie Shek – Moneybags
Yuen Kwai – Rubber Legs' student
David Wu – Pickpocket
Yen Shi-kwan – Sickness Master
Brandy Yuen – Fake Sam Seed
Sharon Noble – Various Women

See also
List of Hong Kong films
Wong Fei-hung filmography

External links
 IMDb entry

1979 films
1979 martial arts films
1970s martial arts comedy films
1970s Cantonese-language films
Films directed by Yuen Woo-ping
Hong Kong martial arts comedy films
Hong Kong slapstick comedy films
Kung fu films
Wushu films
1970s Hong Kong films